The Revolutionary Armed Forces of Colombia (FARC) was a self-proclaimed Marxist-Leninist revolutionary guerrilla organization, listed internationally as a terrorist group by a number of countries. Estimates claim that the FARC at one point had hundreds of hostages who were held for ransom.

The following list of former hostages are what the FARC called "canjeables" (exchangeable), as they offered their freedom in return for the liberty of 500 FARC members held in Colombian prisons through a prisoner exchange. The humanitarian exchange never happened. The FARC released their last political hostages in April 2012.

Former hostages

References

Speech by President Uribe; January 10th, 2008 
Colombia Clamors 
Las Voces del Secuestro 
BBC News: Betancourt 'rescued in Colombia'

FARC